Tailfeather Woman was a Dakota woman who is said to have given the Drum Dance to the Anishinaabe people. The Drum Dance is a set of spiritual beliefs that center on Tailfeather Woman and her escape from the American military, after which she built a large drum while in hiding. The religion spread throughout a large swathe of North America after about 1877. The drum used in the Drum Dance is the forerunner of the large drum used in modern powwows.

References

 

Anishinaabe mythology
Goddesses of the indigenous peoples of North America
Native American dances
Women in mythology